Bert Ehgartner (born 7 October 1962 in Waidhofen an der Ybbs, Lower Austria, Austria) is an Austrian author, journalist, screenwriter, executive producer and director.

Early life 
Ehgartner studied journalism, political science and computer science in Vienna, and completed courses in evidence-based medicine. Since 1987 Ehgartner has worked as a freelance journalist, writing for the weekly news magazine profil, Der Standard, an Austrian daily newspaper, and for Süddeutsche Zeitung, the largest German daily newspaper. From 1990 to 1996, he was editor in charge of the Austrian weekly magazine Die Ganze Woche, and from 2000 to 2005 he was editor in charge of the health website surfmed.de.

He also wrote several books on health and science topics.

Ehgartner wrote Dirty Little Secret – The Aluminum Files (available only in German and Polish) and directed a 90-minute documentary film, The Age of Aluminium, where he explains the science behind the threat that he infers from certain aluminium compounds (e.g. aluminium sulfate by referencing the Camelford water pollution incident).

Awards and nominations 
 2000: Medikinale-International Munich, Germany: First prize "summa cum laude" for the documentary film Ticks – The Real Vampires (2000)
 2001: Grand prix at the 39th TECHFILM – International Festival of Films on Science, Technology and Art, Prague, Czech Republic for the documentary film Ticks – The Real Vampires (2000)

Bibliography 
 Dirty little secret – The Age of Aluminium (2012)
  (Healthy until the doctor comes: A book for self-defence) (2010)
  (Praise the disease: why it is healthy to get sick from time to time) (2008)
  (The life formula - Seven secrets to living a long and happy life) (2004)
 With Kurt Langbein:  (The health care cartel – The Seven Deadly Sins of the medical industry) (2002)
 With Kurt Langbein, Christian Skalnik, Inge Smolek, Michaela Streimelweger, Doris Tschabitscher:  (Bioterrorism – The most dangerous weapons of warfare in the world. Who possesses them - what they can do - how to protect yourself) (2002)

Filmography 
 The Age of Aluminium (director), ZDF / ARTE, ORF und SRF, Menschen & Mächte, (2012)
  (Without eating animals) (director), ORF, Kreuz & Quer, (2011)
  (Fight against corruption - 250 years Austrian Court of Audit) (director), ORF, Menschen und Mächte, (2011)
  (Patient healthcare system) (director), ORF, Report Spezial, (2008)
  (The common habits of Austrians) (director), ORF, various episodes (2003-2006)
  (Feng Shui – in the everyday life) (director), ORF (2003)
 Bioterror (director), RTL (2001)
 Ticks – The Real Vampires (director), WDR / ARTE, ORF, Discovery Channel (2000)
  (The Skin – Mirror of the Soul) (director), ORF, RTL (1999)
  (Allergies – If nature becomes your enemy) (director), ORF (1999)
  ('War within the body')(director), RTL (1998)
  (Hillmen) (director), ORF (1998)

External links 

 Official website of Bert Ehgartner
 DC Environmental Film Festival 2013 showing The Age of Aluminium
 DC Environmental Film Festival 2013 Attending Filmmakers

Austrian documentary film directors
Austrian screenwriters
Austrian journalists
People from Waidhofen an der Ybbs
1962 births
Living people
Austrian male screenwriters